Bagh-e Bar Aftab (also Romanized as Bāgh-e Bar Āftāb) is a village in Qarah Kahriz Rural District, Qarah Kahriz District, Shazand County, Markazi Province, Iran. At the 2006 census, its population was 1,556, in 393 families.

References 

Populated places in Shazand County